Bert Church High School is a high school in Airdrie, Alberta, Canada with approximately 1100 students in enrollment. The school is under the administration of Rocky View School Division. Bert Church High School is named after Bert Church, the son of an early Alberta settler, and a member of the rural school board of Calgary.

History 
Bert Church High School opened in 1983, becoming Airdrie's only high school. The school replaced George McDougall High School, which became a Junior High School. This arrangement lasted for four years, after which George McDougall reverted back to a high school to alleviate demand from Bert Church. Bert Church High School's namesake is Bert Church, who died in 1984. He was the son of one of Alberta's earliest settlers, W.J. Church, who arrived in 1890. Bert was a member of the rural school board of Calgary.

Programs, courses, and clubs
The school offers an assortment of clubs and courses for students to choose from. Musical programs at Bert Church include: concert choir, junior and senior concert band, as well as senior jazz band, which have performed for former Alberta Premier, Alison Redford. Bert Church also is noted for its drama, performing arts and technical theater courses, which put on winter and spring productions.

Theatre
Bert Church High School is noted for its 373-seat proscenium theatre which is used for both school productions, and professional productions. The theatre is also used as a teaching space for grade 9-12 drama classes.

Athletics
Bert Church offers a variety of athletic programs including football, volleyball, basketball, cross country running, soccer, golf, and curling. The school's official team name is The Bert Church Chargers.

Under Armour Finding Undeniable Contest
Bert Church High School was the Under Armour Finding Undeniable 2013 winner. The school received support from then premier Alison Redford, MP Blake Richards, and Rocky Views superintendent Greg Bass in a contest that could win $100,000 in sports equipment.

Special Olympics 
In 2018, Bert Church participated in the Ontario Special Olympics, winning a gold medal.  Four of their students defended their title in 2019, winning bronze medals each.

Notable alumni
 Ty Rattie: Professional hockey player drafted 32nd overall in the 2011 NHL Entry Draft by the St. Louis Blues.

References

External links

Educational institutions established in 1986
Airdrie, Alberta
High schools in Alberta
1986 establishments in Alberta